King of My Heart may refer to:

 "King of My Heart", a song by Taylor Swift from Reputation (2017)
 "King of My Heart", a song by Tara Dettman from Sea to Sea: I See the Cross (2005)
 "King of My Heart", a song by Bethel Music from Starlight (2017)
 "King of My Heart", a song by Leeland from Invisible (2016)
 "King of My Heart", a song from the 2007 London revival of Joseph and the Amazing Technicolor Dreamcoat
 "King of My Heart", a song by Melba Moore from Read My Lips (1985)